Miguel Eduardo Del Pozo (born October 14, 1992) is a Dominican professional baseball pitcher in the Detroit Tigers organization. He has played in Major League Baseball (MLB) for the Los Angeles Angels and Pittsburgh Pirates.

Career

Miami Marlins
Del Pozo signed with the Florida Marlins as an international free agent on November 20, 2010. He spent the 2011 season with the DSL Marlins, going 3–3 with a 5.09 ERA in  innings. He played for the GCL Marlins in 2012, going 1–2 with a 4.02 ERA in 31 innings. His 2013 season was split between the Batavia Muckdogs and the Jupiter Hammerheads, going a combined 2–1 with a 4.44 ERA over 26 innings. He spent the 2014 season with the Greensboro Grasshoppers, going 2–6 with a 4.91 ERA in 66 innings. He returned to Jupiter for the 2015 season, going 2–5 with a 4.25 ERA in 59 innings. He missed the 2016 season due to Tommy John surgery. He split the 2017 season between the GCL, Greensboro, Jupiter, and the Jacksonville Jumbo Shrimp, going a combined 3–0 with a 0.70 ERA in  innings. Del Pozo was added to the Marlins 40-man roster following the 2017 season. He returned to Jacksonville for the 2018 season, going 5–0 with a 3.97 ERA in 34 innings. Del Pozo was outrighted off the Marlins roster on October 26. He elected free agency on November 2.

Texas Rangers
Del Pozo signed a minor league contract with the Texas Rangers on December 21, 2018. He was assigned to the Nashville Sounds and went 2–3 with a 5.12 ERA in  innings for them.

Los Angeles Angels
On August 9, 2019, Del Pozo was traded to the Los Angeles Angels in exchange for cash considerations. He was assigned to the Salt Lake Bees following the trade.

On August 18, 2019, the Angels selected Del Pozo's contract and promoted him to the major leagues. He made his major league debut on August 20 versus the Texas Rangers, pitching  of an inning. Del Pozo elected free agency following the 2019 season.

Pittsburgh Pirates
On December 17, 2019, Del Pozo signed a minor-league contract with the Pittsburgh Pirates. During his first three appearances on the Pirates roster in 2020 he walked eight of fourteen batters. In an August 3, 2020 game against the Minnesota Twins, he walked all of the three batters he faced, before being taken off the mound. In his next appearance, he gave up three runs on five hits over two innings, and was optioned the following day. Del Pozo was designated for assignment on August 13. Del Pozo elected free agency on October 13, 2020.

Detroit Tigers
On January 7, 2021, Del Pozo signed a minor-league contract with the Detroit Tigers. He was assigned to the Triple-A Toledo Mud Hens to begin the season, and recorded a stellar 1.32 ERA in 12 appearances. On June 15, Del Pozo was selected to the active roster. Del Pozo logged a 3.38 ERA in 5 appearances for Detroit in 2021. On April 6, 2022, Del Pozo was designated for assignment by the Tigers. He was outrighted to Triple-A Toledo the following day. He elected free agency on October 6, 2022, but signed a new minor-league contract with Detroit on October 21, 2022.

References

External links

1992 births
Living people
Sportspeople from Santo Domingo
Dominican Republic expatriate baseball players in the United States
Major League Baseball players from the Dominican Republic
Major League Baseball pitchers
Los Angeles Angels players
Pittsburgh Pirates players
Detroit Tigers players
Dominican Summer League Marlins players
Gulf Coast Marlins players
Batavia Muckdogs players
Greensboro Grasshoppers players
Jupiter Hammerheads players
Jacksonville Jumbo Shrimp players
Nashville Sounds players
Salt Lake Bees players
Toledo Mud Hens players
Salt River Rafters players
Gigantes del Cibao players